Kalateh-ye Derakht-e Bid (also Romanized as Kalāteh-ye Derakht-e Bīd) is a village in Torqabeh Rural District, Torqabeh District, Torqabeh and Shandiz County, Razavi Khorasan Province, Iran. At the 2006 census, its population was 70, in 21 families.

References 

Populated places in Torqabeh and Shandiz County